1517 Media, formerly Augsburg Fortress Press, is the official publishing house of the Evangelical Lutheran Church in America (ELCA). It also publishes for the Evangelical Lutheran Church in Canada as Augsburg Fortress Canada. Headquartered on South Fifth Street in Minneapolis, Minnesota, in the former headquarters of the American Lutheran Church, Augsburg Fortress publishes Living Lutheran (founded 1831, named The Lutheran until 2016), the Lutheran Book of Worship (1978), the Lutheran Study Bible, and Evangelical Lutheran Worship (2006), as well as a range of academic, reference, and educational books. Tim Blevins has served as the CEO of 1517 Media since August, 2018. Beth Lewis served as the CEO of Augsburg Fortress since September 3, 2002.

History
Augsburg Fortress was formed in 1988 when the Fortress Press of Philadelphia, Pennsylvania, and Augsburg Publishing House of Minneapolis, Minnesota, merged when their parent denominations, the Lutheran Church in America (LCA) and the American Lutheran Church (ALC) merged to form the ELCA.

Augsburg Publishing House was affiliated with the ALC. It had been founded in 1891 at Augsburg Seminary in Minneapolis  Both the publishing house and seminary were part of the United Norwegian Lutheran Church of America (UNLC). The publishing house left the seminary campus in 1894, relocating to the downtown area in 1908. By 1960 it had become the publishing house of the Evangelical Lutheran Church. With the 1960 merger of Lutheran denominations that formed the "new" American Lutheran Church, Augsburg was designated that church's publishing arm. It absorbed the publishing houses of the other denominations participating in the merger, including Wartburg Press (established 1881) of the "old" American Lutheran Church in Columbus, Ohio, and the Danish Lutheran Publishing House (established 1893) of the United Evangelical Lutheran Church in Blair, Nebraska. When the Lutheran Free Church joined the ALC in 1963, its publishing house, Messenger Press (established 1922), was also added. 

Augsburg, and Wartburg before it, had published the old ALC denominational magazine The Lutheran Standard, which had ancestry back to the 1840s in the Evangelical Lutheran Joint Synod of Ohio.

Fortress Press was the publishing arm of the LCA, headquartered in northwest Philadelphia, Pennsylvania, in the Muhlenberg Building, a unique U-shaped brick building of Georgian architecture style. The building was named for Henry Melchoir Muhlenberg and other members of the Muhlenberg family who were important in American Lutheranism. Henry is considered the "Patriarch of American Lutheranism" and the prime organizer of the first Lutheran synod in America, the Pennsylvania Ministerium, in 1746.

The LCA came into existence in 1962 with the merger of several smaller Lutheran denominations. The largest forerunner of the Fortress Press was the Muhlenberg Press of the United Lutheran Church in America, the largest partner in the LCA merger. The oldest ancestor was the Henkel Press, started by the son of Paul Henkel, a famous late 18th and early 19th century Lutheran pastor, missionary, and evangelist in the Appalachian Mountains region.

Fortress published The Lutheran, the monthly magazine of the LCA and also of the earlier United Lutheran Church in America. The magazine had its beginnings in 1831 in publications of the General Synod.

In July 2016, the Augsburg Fortress re-branded as 1517 Media. It continues to use Augsburg Fortress as an imprint for church resources and Fortress Press as an imprint for academic and reference titles. Other imprints include Beaming Books, Broadleaf Books, and Sparkhouse.

See also
 Concordia Publishing House, the Lutheran Church–Missouri Synod's official publishing house
 Northwestern Publishing House, the Wisconsin Evangelical Lutheran Synod's official publishing house

References

External links
1517 Media official site
Augsburg Fortress official site
Beaming Books official site
Broadleaf Books official site
Fortress Press official site
Living Lutheran official magazine of the ELCA
Sparkhouse official site

Christian publishing companies
Book publishing companies based in Minnesota
Publishing companies established in 1988
Evangelical Lutheran Church in America